Povich is a surname. Notable people with the surname include:

 Lynn Povich (born 1943), American journalist
 Maury Povich (born 1939), American television personality
 Shirley Povich (1905–1998), American sports columnist and reporter

See also
 Polich (surname)
 Pović
 Yovich